Kahena Kunze (born 12 March 1991) is a Brazilian sailor in the 49er FX class. Together with Martine Grael she won the 49er FX class at the 2014 ISAF Sailing World Championships and a gold medal in the inaugural 49er FX race, during the 2016 Rio Olympics, a feat both repeated at Tokyo 2020.

Life 
She is the daughter of Claudio Kunze, a former sailor who won a junior world championship in the Penguin class. Her name is an homage to the warrior Kahina.

Achievements

References

External links

 

1991 births
Living people
Sportspeople from São Paulo
Brazilian female sailors (sport)
420 class sailors
49er FX class sailors
Olympic sailors of Brazil
Olympic gold medalists for Brazil
Olympic medalists in sailing
Sailors at the 2016 Summer Olympics – 49er FX
Sailors at the 2020 Summer Olympics – 49er FX
Medalists at the 2016 Summer Olympics
Medalists at the 2020 Summer Olympics
49er FX class world champions
World champions in sailing for Brazil
ISAF World Sailor of the Year (female)
Pan American Games medalists in sailing
Pan American Games silver medalists for Brazil
Sailors at the 2015 Pan American Games
Sailors at the 2019 Pan American Games
Medalists at the 2015 Pan American Games
Medalists at the 2019 Pan American Games